Get Dead  is an American punk rock band from San Francisco Bay Area, California. They were formed in 2007 and were soon noticed by Fat Mike of NOFX and signed to his label, Fat Wreck Chords.

History
Get Dead released their debut album Bad News in 2013 on Fat Wreck Chords.

Their second full length album for Fat Wreck Chords, Honesty Lives Elsewhere, was released in 2016 and featured guest appearances by members of label-mate bands Lagwagon, toyGuitar and Old Man Markley.

In early 2019 the band revealed that they were recording their first album since 2016.

Anarchist art collective Indecline used a Get Dead cover of "I Wanna Be Your Dog" by The Stooges for their project entitled "Hate Breed" which was described by Rolling Stone as "20 white men donned T-shirts, MAGA hats and custom collars and were paraded down the Hollywood Walk of Fame by people of color and members of the queer community."

In 2020 the band released Dancing With The Curse.

Band members
Current members
Sam King - lead vocals
Tim Mehew - bass, vocals
Mike McGuire - guitar, vocals
Scott Powell - drums, bellpepper
Kyle Santos - guitar

Former members
Josh Garcia - drums, percussion, engineer, producer (All Get Dead releases)
David 'Moki' Marino - guitar, vocals (Forged In The Furnace of Rad, Tall Cans And Loose Ends, Bad News, Bygones, Honesty Lives Elsewhere)  
JP Mangano - guitar, vocals (Letters Home, Self Titled EP)
Jeremy Korkki - guitar, vocals

References

External links
Get Dead at Bandcamp
Get Dead at Facebook
Get Dead discography at Fat Wreck Chords

Musical groups established in 2007
Fat Wreck Chords artists
Punk rock groups from California
Political music groups